Zhou Yifeng (born 1977/1978) is a Chinese businessman and billionaire who founded the liquefied petroleum gas Shenzhen-listed Oriental Energy Company.

He holds degrees from the Beijing University of Traditional Chinese Medicine and the Nanjing University of Science and Technology.

He is married and lives in Zhangjiagang, China.

Forbes lists his net worth as of April 2022 at US$1.0 billion.

References 

1970s births
Year of birth uncertain

Living people
Chinese businesspeople
Chinese billionaires